Norway competed at the 1948 Summer Olympics in London, England. 81 competitors, 77 men and 4 women, took part in 50 events in 12 sports.

Athletics

Boxing

Canoeing

Cycling

Four cyclists, all men, represented Norway in 1948.

Individual road race
 Lorang Christiansen
 Leif Flengsrud
 Erling Kristiansen
 Aage Myhrvold

Team road race
 Lorang Christiansen
 Leif Flengsrud
 Erling Kristiansen
 Aage Myhrvold

Diving

Fencing

Five fencers, all men, represented Norway in 1948.

Men's épée
 Egill Knutzen
 Alfred Eriksen
 Claus Mørch Sr.

Men's team épée
 Johan von Koss, Egill Knutzen, Alfred Eriksen, Claus Mørch Sr., Sverre Gillebo

Rowing

Norway had 14 male rowers participate in two out of seven rowing events in 1948.

 Men's coxed four
 Arne Serck-Hanssen
 Gunnar Sandborg
 Sigurd Grønli
 Willy Evensen
 Thoralf Sandaker (cox)

 Men's eight
 Kristoffer Lepsøe
 Thorstein Kråkenes
 Hans Hansen
 Halfdan Gran Olsen
 Harald Kråkenes
 Leif Næss
 Thor Pedersen
 Carl Monssen
 Sigurd Monssen (cox)

Sailing

Shooting

Nine shooters represented Norway in 1948. Willy Røgeberg won a bronze medal in the 300 metre pistol event.

25 metre pistol
 Birger Bühring-Andersen
 Odd Bonde Nielsen
 Hans Aasnæs

50 metre pistol
 Gunnar Svendsen
 Mauritz Amundsen

300 metre rifle
 Willy Røgeberg
 Halvor Kongsjorden
 Odd Sannes

50 metre rifle
 Halvor Kongsjorden
 Thore Skredegaard
 Willy Røgeberg

Swimming

Bea Ballintijn

Wrestling

Art competitions

References

External links
Official Olympic Reports
International Olympic Committee results database

Nations at the 1948 Summer Olympics
1948
O